Brett Kendall (born 3 April 1957) is an alpine skier from New Zealand.

In the 1976 Winter Olympics at Innsbruck, he came 60th in the Downhill, 36th in the Slalom and 44th in the Giant Slalom.

His brother Scott Kendall competed at the 1980 Winter Olympics.

References

External links  
 
 

Living people
1957 births
New Zealand male alpine skiers
Olympic alpine skiers of New Zealand
Alpine skiers at the 1976 Winter Olympics